A number of churches and basilicas are named after Saint Joseph. Cathedrals are listed separately at St. Joseph's Cathedral. Notable churches include:

Belarus
St. Joseph Church, Minsk

Bosnia and Herzegovina 
Saint Joseph's Church, Sarajevo

Canada 
Saint Joseph's Oratory, Montréal
St. Joseph (Ottawa)

Cambodia 
St Joseph's Church, Phnom Penh

China 
St. Joseph's Church, Beijing
St. Joseph's Church, Jinan
Saint Joseph's Church, Shanghai
St. Joseph's Church, Shaoxing

Colombia 
Saint Joseph's Church, Envigado

Finland 
Saint Joseph's Church, Kuopio

France
St. Joseph's Church, Le Havre

French Guiana 
Saint Joseph's Church, Iracoubo

Germany 
St. Joseph's Church, Königsberg
St Joseph's Church, Mühlhausen

India 
St. Joseph's Catholic Church (Baramulla), Jammu and Kashmir
St. Joseph Church, Belman, Karnataka

Indonesia 
St. Joseph's Church, Semarang

Ireland
St. Joseph's Church, East Wall

Israel
St. Joseph's Church, Nazareth

Japan
St. Joseph Roman Catholic Church, Nishijin, Kyoto

Jordan
St. Joseph's Church, Amman

Latvia
St. Joseph's Church, Riga

Macao
St. Joseph the Worker Church (Macau)

Malaysia 
St. Joseph's Cathedral, Kuching, Sarawak

Malta
St Joseph's Church, Msida
Old St Joseph's in the Citadel

Netherlands
St. Joseph, Leiden

New Zealand
St Joseph's Church, Mt Victoria

Philippines 
Saint Joseph Church (Las Piñas), Metro Manila
Santuario de San Jose, Mandaluyong
Saint Joseph the Patriarch Church (Batangas)
Dingras Church
St. Joseph Church (Baras, Rizal)
 National Shine of Saint Joseph Parish, Mandaue City

Poland
St. Joseph's Church, Lublin
St. Joseph's Church, Podgórze
St Joseph's Church, Zabrze

Romania
St. Joseph's Roman Catholic Church (Sighișoara)

Singapore 
Saint Joseph's Church, Victoria Street

United Kingdom

England
 St Joseph's Church, Aldershot, Hampshire
St Joseph's Church, Birkdale, Merseyside
St Joseph's Church in the parish of St Patrick's Church, Bradford, West Yorkshire
St Joseph's Church, Brighton
St Joseph's Church, Dorking
St Joseph's Roman Catholic Church, Gateshead
 St Joseph's Church, Hartlepool
St Joseph's Church, Highgate, London
St Joseph's Roman Catholic Church, Leigh
 St Joseph's Church, Maidenhead
 St Joseph's Church, Newbury
St Joseph's Church, Preston
 St Joseph and St Francis Xavier Church, Richmond, North Yorkshire
St Joseph Church, Roehampton, London
 St Joseph's Church, Southampton
 St Joseph's Church, Stockport
 St Joseph's Church, Weston-super-Mare

Wales
 St Joseph's Church, Port Talbot
St Joseph's Roman Catholic Church, Colwyn Bay

United States
Churches include (listed by State): 
Saint Joseph's Roman Catholic Church (Mobile, Alabama)
Old St. Joseph's Catholic Church, Nome, Alaska
 St. Joseph Catholic Church (Tontitown, Arkansas)
 Saint Joseph Parish (Mountain View, California)
 Cathedral Basilica of St. Joseph (San Jose), California
 St. Joseph's Church (Capulin, Colorado), listed on the National Register of Historic Places (NRHP) in Conejos County
 St. Joseph's Roman Catholic Church (Denver), Colorado
 St. Joseph's Polish Roman Catholic Church, Denver, Colorado
 St. Joseph Church (Ansonia, Connecticut)
 St. Joseph Church (Brookfield, Connecticut)
 St. Joseph Church (Danbury, Connecticut)
 Saint Joseph Church (Norwalk, Connecticut)
 St. Joseph's Catholic Church (Wilmington, Delaware)
 St. Joseph's Catholic Church (Palm Bay, Florida)
 Saint Joseph's Catholic Church (Macon, Georgia)
 St. Joseph's Catholic Church (Bovill, Idaho), listed on the National Register of Historic Places in Latah County, Idaho
 St. Joseph's Catholic Church (Pocatello, Idaho)
 St. Joseph the Betrothed Ukrainian Greek Catholic Church, Chicago, Illinois
 St. Joseph Roman Catholic Church (Chicago), Illinois
 St. Joseph Catholic Church (Wilmette, Illinois)
 St. Joseph's Catholic Church (Jasper, Indiana)
 St. Joseph's Catholic Church (Bauer, Iowa)
 St. Joseph's Catholic Church (Davenport, Iowa)
 Saint Joseph's Prairie Church, Dubuque, Iowa
 St. Joseph's Catholic Church (Elkader, Iowa)
 St. Joseph's Church Complex (Fort Madison, Iowa)
 Saint Joseph's Catholic Church (Key West, Iowa)
St. Joseph's Roman Catholic Church (Stone City, Iowa)
 St. Joseph Catholic Church (Damar, Kansas)
 St. Joseph's Catholic Church (Topeka, Kansas)
 St. Joseph's Catholic Church (Bowling Green, Kentucky)
 St. Joseph Catholic Church (Camp Springs, Kentucky)
 St. Joseph's Catholic Church (Owensboro, Kentucky)
 Saint Joseph's Church (Biddeford, Maine)
 St. Joseph's Catholic Church (Lewiston, Maine)
 St. Joseph Catholic Church (Boston, Massachusetts)
St. Joseph's Church (Fall River, Massachusetts)
 St. Joseph Catholic Church (Roxbury, Massachusetts)
 St. Joseph's Church (Springfield, Massachusetts)
 Saint Joseph Church and Shrine, Cambridge Township, Michigan
 St. Joseph Oratory, Detroit, Michigan
 Saint Joseph Church and Shrine, Lenawee County, Michigan
St. Joseph Roman Catholic Church (Apple Creek, Missouri)
St. Joseph's Roman Catholic Church (St. Louis, Missouri), listed on the National Register of Historic Places in St. Louis
 St. Joseph Church (Westphalia, Missouri)
 St. Joseph's Catholic Church (Hardin, Montana)
 St. Joseph's Catholic Church (Moiese, Montana)
 St. Joseph's Catholic Mission Church, Townsend, Montana,
 St. Joseph's Polish Catholic Church, Camden, New Jersey
 Church of St. Joseph (Bronxville, New York)
 St. Joseph Church (Yorkville, Manhattan), New York
 St. Joseph's Church (Utica, New York), listed on the NRHP
 St. Joseph's Catholic Church (Mountain Island, North Carolina)
 St. Joseph's Catholic Church (Egypt, Ohio)
 St. Joseph Catholic Church (Ironton, Ohio)
 St. Joseph's Catholic Church (Springfield, Ohio)
Saint Joseph's Roman Catholic Church (Massillon, Ohio)
 St. Joseph's Catholic Church (Krebs, Oklahoma)
 St. Joseph's Catholic Church (Salem, Oregon)
 Old St. Joseph's Church, Philadelphia, Pennsylvania
St. Joseph's Roman Catholic Church (Providence, Rhode Island)
 St. Joseph Church (St. Joseph, Tennessee)
 St. Joseph's Church (Galveston, Texas)
 St. Joseph Catholic Church (San Antonio, Texas)
 Saint Joseph Catholic Church (Alexandria, Virginia)
 National Shrine of Saint Joseph (De Pere, Wisconsin) 
Saint Joseph's Oratory (Green Bay, Wisconsin)
 St. Peter's and St. Joseph's Catholic Churches, Oconto, Wisconsin
St. Joseph's Roman Catholic Church (Shields, Wisconsin)
 St. Joseph's Catholic Church Complex (Waukesha, Wisconsin)
 Saint Joseph of the Lake Church and Cemetery, Menominee Indian Reservation, Wisconsin

Vietnam
 St. Joseph's Cathedral, Hanoi

References

St Joseph
churches named after Saint Joseph
Saint Joseph (husband of Mary)